There are 44 counties in the U.S. state of Idaho.

The Idaho Territory was organized in March 1863, and Owyhee County was the first county in the territory to be organized, in December of that year. Oneida County was organized in January 1864, while Missoula County was adopted the same month, before becoming part of the new Montana Territory in May. Shoshone, Nez Perce, Idaho and Boise Counties were recognized in February 1864; Alturas County was organized the same month. In December 1864, Kootenai and Ada Counties were created; Lah-Toh County was also created at this time but was abolished in 1867.

Idaho's present-day boundaries were established in 1868, and Lemhi County was created the following year. By the time Idaho was admitted to the Union as the 43rd state in 1890, a further eight counties had been created, bringing the total to 18. After Canyon, Fremont and Bannock Counties had been created, Alturas and Logan Counties were merged to form Blaine County in March 1895; Lincoln County was formed out of Blaine County later the same month. Bonner and Twin Falls Counties were created in 1907, before a further 21 counties were created between 1911 and 1919, bringing the total to the present-day 44.

Since 1945, each county has used a code on its license plates that features the first letter of the county's name. Where the names of two or more counties start with the same letter, in each of these counties the letter is preceded by a number indicating that county's order in the alphabetical list. For instance, the four counties beginning with 'L' in alphabetical order are Latah, Lemhi, Lewis and Lincoln; the codes for these counties are thus 1L, 2L, 3L and 4L respectively. Elmore, Idaho, Kootenai, Nez Perce, Shoshone, Valley, and Washington Counties are the only ones in the state with their respective first letters; in these counties, the letter alone serves as the code.

Alphabetical list

|}

Extinct counties
Alturas County created February 4, 1864, and abolished March 5, 1895.
Logan County created February 7, 1889, and abolished March 5, 1895.

References

 
Idaho, counties in
Counties